Elise Tamaëla (born 22 January 1984) is a Dutch tennis coach and former professional tennis player.

On 12 February 2007, she achieved a career-high WTA singles ranking of 129. On 9 April 2007, she reached her highest doubles ranking of 228. She was coached by Stephan Ehritt.

In her career, Tamaëla won eight singles titles and nine doubles titles on the ITF Women's Circuit.

She was the coach of Kiki Bertens in the period 2019-2021. Tamaëla succeeded Paul Haarhuis as captain of the Netherlands Billie Jean King Cup team in November 2021.

ITF Circuit finals

Singles: 15 (8 titles, 7 runner-ups)

Doubles: 10 (9 titles, 1 runner-up)

Coaching career
From 2016 until 2018, Tamaëla was the coach of Aleksandra Krunić. After Bertens' break up with Raemon Sluiter, she became her head coach in November 2019. She had been a member of the team for about a year.

References

External links
  
 

1984 births
Living people
Dutch female tennis players
People from Tiel
Sportspeople from Gelderland